The men's long jump event at the 2014 African Championships in Athletics was held August 10–11 on Stade de Marrakech.

Medalists

Results

Qualification
Qualifying performance: 7.80 (Q) or 12 best performers (q) advanced to the Final.

Final

References

2014 African Championships in Athletics
Long jump at the African Championships in Athletics